Danish Pakistani or Pakistani Danish may refer to:
Denmark-Pakistan relations (c.f. "a Danish-Pakistani treaty")
A danish pastry manufactured in Pakistan or by Pakistanis
Any Pakistani desserts which might be described by analogy to the danish pastry
Pakistanis in Denmark
Danes in Pakistan
Mixed race individuals of Danish and Pakistani descent
Multiple citizenship of Denmark and Pakistan
Pakistanis with the name Danish:
Ihsan Danish, Pakistani poet
Noon Meem Danish, Pakistani poet
Danish Kaneria, Pakistani cricketer